is the first and only greatest hits album by Japanese singer-songwriter Miho Komatsu. It was released on 22 November 2006 under Giza Studio.

Background
Album includes all singles chronologically released - from her debut single Nazo until Koi ni Nare plus new song happy ending.

It was released on same day as her second essay book Hen na Monosashi 2.

Till the date this is last album which Miho Komatsu released before hiatus.

Charting
The album reached #21 in its first week and sold more than 14,000 copies. The album charted for 7 weeks and sold more than 20,000 copies.

Track listing

Disc one
All the songs were arranged by Hitohito Furui from Garnet Crow (#1~#9), Daisuke Ikeda (#10) and Yoshinobu Ohga from OOM (#11~#14)

Disc two
All the songs has been arranged by Yoshinobu Ohga from OOM (#1,#2,#12), Akihito Tokunaga from Doa (#3,#5), Satoru Kobayashi (#4,#10) and Hirohito Furui from Garnet Crow (#6~#9,#11,#13)

References

Miho Komatsu songs
Being Inc. compilation albums
Giza Studio albums
2006 compilation albums
Japanese-language compilation albums
Albums produced by Daiko Nagato